Festuca donax is a species of grass which can be found in Africa and Macaronesia.

Description
Leaf-blades are  broad with scabrous margins.

The glumes are chartaceous, lanceolate, keelless, with acuminate apexes, with only difference is in size. Lemma itself is muticous with acute apex and scaberulous surface. The fruits are caryopses with an additional pericarp, which just like flowers is hairy as well. Hilum is linear.

References

donax
Flora of Africa
Flora of Macaronesia